Park Falls Municipal Airport  is a city owned public use airport located two nautical miles (4 km) northeast of the central business district of Park Falls, a city in Price County, Wisconsin, United States. It is included in the Federal Aviation Administration (FAA) National Plan of Integrated Airport Systems for 2021–2025, in which it is categorized as a basic general aviation facility.

Facilities and aircraft 
Park Falls Municipal Airport covers an area of 72 acres (29 ha) at an elevation of 1,501 feet (458 m) above mean sea level. It has one runway designated 18/36 with an asphalt surface measuring 3,200 by 60 feet (975 x 18 m), with approved GPS approaches. The Park Falls NDB navaid, (PKF) frequency 371 kHz, is located on the field.

For the 12-month period ending August 19, 2020, the airport had 6,750 aircraft operations, an average of 18 per day: 97% general aviation and 3% air taxi. In February 2023, there were 4 aircraft based at this airport: all 4 single-engine.

See also 
 List of airports in Wisconsin

References

External links 
 Airport page at City of Park Falls website
  at Wisconsin DOT Airport Directory
 

Airports in Wisconsin
Transportation in Price County, Wisconsin